Kerseblept Nunatak (Nunatak Kerseblept \'nu-na-tak ker-se-'blept\) is a rocky hill of elevation 90 m projecting from Yakoruda Glacier on Greenwich Island in the South Shetland Islands, Antarctica.  The hill is named after the Thracian king Cersobleptes, 359-341 BC.

Location

Maps
 L.L. Ivanov et al. Antarctica: Livingston Island and Greenwich Island, South Shetland Islands. Scale 1:100000 topographic map. Sofia: Antarctic Place-names Commission of Bulgaria, 2005.
 L.L. Ivanov. Antarctica: Livingston Island and Greenwich, Robert, Snow and Smith Islands. Scale 1:120000 topographic map.  Troyan: Manfred Wörner Foundation, 2009.

References
 Kerseblept Nunatak. SCAR Composite Antarctic Gazetteer
 Bulgarian Antarctic Gazetteer. Antarctic Place-names Commission. (details in Bulgarian, basic data in English)

External links
 Kerseblept Nunatak. Copernix satellite image

Nunataks of Greenwich Island